Pescia Cathedral is a Roman Catholic cathedral in Pescia, Tuscany, Italy, dedicated to the Assumption of the Virgin Mary and to Saint John the Baptist.

It is the episcopal seat of the Diocese of Pescia.

Roman Catholic cathedrals in Italy
Roman Catholic churches in Pescia
Cathedrals in Tuscany